Wynford Local School District is a public school district serving students in the Bucyrus area in Crawford County, Ohio, United States. The school district enrolls 1,679 students as of the 2020–2021 academic year.

Schools

Elementary schools
Wynford Elementary School

Middle schools
Wynford Middle School

High schools
Wynford High School

References

External links
Wynford Local School District official website

Education in Crawford County, Ohio
School districts in Ohio